Colin Wyatt is an American drummer and songwriter. He is a founding member of Osgoods, the rock band formed in Tucson, Arizona with school-mate and guitarist Anthony Nigro. In 1998, Wyatt relocated to Los Angeles.

Discography with Osgoods
Automatic Do-Over (2003, re-released 2008)
Smother and Shrink (2006)

References

External links

American drummers
Year of birth missing (living people)
Living people